Ocean Odyssey (working title Oceans) is a two-part, two-hour (the two parts last an hour long) television programme produced for the BBC by the production company Impossible Pictures.

It follows the life of a bull sperm whale from his birth until his death, stranded on a beach (originally it was to be a voyage in a submarine).

Unlike most Impossible Pictures productions, it uses CGI to recreate currently living rather than extinct creatures. Most of the backgrounds are also CG.

BBC Television shows
2000s British television miniseries
Discovery Channel original programming